Kõpu Peninsula is a peninsula on the island of Hiiumaa in Hiiu County, Estonia.

Among the villages on the peninsula are Hirmuste, Jõesuu, Kalana, Kaleste, Kiduspe, Kõpu, Luidja and Mägipe. Also located on the peninsula are Ristna Cape, Kõpu Lighthouse and Ristna Lighthouse.

Part of the peninsula is under protection as Kõpu Nature Reserve.

References

Peninsulas of Estonia
Hiiu County